Trnovec is a village in northern Croatia, part of the Nedelišće municipality within Međimurje County.

History

Trnovec is first time mentioned in charter issued in year 1478 as Ternacz Maius.
Catholic Chapel in Trnovec was built in the year 1908.

Geography

Trnovec is about 11 kilometres west from the centre of Čakovec, and some 90 kilometres north of Zagreb.

Trnovec is situated in the alluvial plane of river Drava, on rivers left bank.
 
There is a border crossing with Slovenia just outside the village. Border crossing is located on road that connects county seat Čakovec with town of Ormož in Slovenia.

Trnovec had a population of 390 in 2011 census.

References

Footnotes

Citations

Populated places in Međimurje County